Mathias Adah Ogwuche (born 14 April 1998) is a Nigerian footballer who plays as a forward for Remo Stars.

He spent time in Norway on trials with Lillestrøm SK in 2017, as well as Notodden FK and Hamkam in early 2018.

Career statistics

Club

Notes

References

1998 births
Living people
Nigerian footballers
Nigeria international footballers
Association football forwards
Nigeria Professional Football League players
Liga Portugal 2 players
Remo Stars F.C. players
C.D. Feirense players
Nigerian expatriate footballers
Nigerian expatriate sportspeople in Portugal
Expatriate footballers in Portugal